A Preemptive strike refers to a surprise attack launched with the stated intention of countering an anticipated enemy offensive.

Preemptive strike may also refer to:

 Preemptive Strike (album), a retrospective compilation album of DJ Shadow's singles released on the UK record label Mo'Wax
 Pre-Emptive Strike, a three-track release by American heavy metal band Five Finger Death Punch
 "Preemptive Strike" (TNG episode), a seventh season episode of Star Trek: The Next Generation
 Pre-emptive nuclear strike

See also 
 Preventive war
 First strike (disambiguation)